The Z 30 is an APS-C mirrorless camera (1.5x APS Crop) announced by Nikon on June 29, 2022. It is the ninth Z-mount camera body and the third APS-C Z-mount body. The Z 30 is the first Z-mount camera body which does not have a built-in viewfinder. The camera yields a 20.9-megapixel still image and 4K video (up to 30 fps), however it does not have In-Body Image Stabilisation (IBIS).

Building on the functionality of the Nikon Z 50 and Nikon Z fc, this model was designed for Vloggers with an emphasis on video recording functions. It is compatible with the ML-L7 Bluetooth remote control (sold separately) and the SmallRig Tripod Grip 3070.

References

External Links

 

Z 30
Z 30
Cameras introduced in 2022